The America Zone was one of the two regional zones of the 1930 International Lawn Tennis Challenge.

4 teams entered the America Zone, with the winner going on to compete in the Inter-Zonal Final against the winner of the Europe Zone. The United States defeated Mexico in the final, and went on to face Italy in the Inter-Zonal Final.

Draw

Semifinals

United States vs. Canada

Final

United States vs. Mexico

References

External links
Davis Cup official website

Davis Cup Americas Zone
America Zone
International Lawn Tennis Challenge